Organization Commission may refer to:

 Organization Commission of the Lao People's Revolutionary Party
 Organization Commission of the Communist Party of Vietnam